is a city located in Akita Prefecture, Japan. ,  the city ha3 an estimated population of 24,687 in 12,496 households, and a population density of 100 persons per km2.

Geography
Oga is located on the Oga Peninsula in northwestern Akita Prefecture, bordered by the Sea of Japan to the north, west and south.  The Oga Peninsula has two mountains, Mount Kanpu and Mtount Honzan, and several rivers, including the Takigawa. Toga Bay is located in the western part of the city, where Toga Port is located, and he northwestern end is called Cape Nyūdō. The population is concentrated in the southern part of the city, where the railway runs and the city hall is located. Much of the city is within the boundaries of the Oga Quasi-National Park.

Neighboring municipalities
Akita Prefecture
 Ōgata
 Mitane
 Katagami

Climate 
Different from the rest of the prefecture, the climate is an isolated humid subtropical (Köppen: Cfa) by direct influence (due to being a peninsula) of the Tsushima Current, being the most northern city of the Asian continent with this categorization according to the 0 °C isotherm. Or the southern edge of the hot-summer humid continental (Dfa) by the normal of the Japan Meteorological Agency. Winters are mild and summers although the climatic type are warm but not hot. The extremes range from -14 to 35 °C, a relatively low thermal amplitude to a place at 39 °N and to the east near large land masses.

Demographics
Per Japanese census data, the population of Oga peaked in the 1950s and has been in decline since then.

History
The area of present-day Oga was part of ancient Dewa Province, dominated by the Satake clan during the Edo period, who ruled Kubota Domain under the Tokugawa shogunate. The village of Funagawa was established with the establishment of the modern municipalities system on April 1, 1889 and became the town of Funagawaminato on October 24, 1894.  The city of Oga was created on March 31, 1954, by the merger of the town of Funagawaminato with the four neighboring villages of Wakimoto, Iriai, Ogatanaka and Toga.

On March 22, 2005, the town of Wakami was merged into Oga.

Government

Oga has a mayor-council form of government with a directly elected mayor and a unicameral city legislature of 18 members. The city contributes one member to the Akita Prefectural Assembly.  In terms of national politics, the city is part of Akita 2nd District  of the lower house of the Diet of Japan.

Economy
The economy of Oga is based on commercial fishing, tourism and agriculture.

Education
Oga has six public elementary schools and two public middle schools operated by the city government and two public high schools operated by the Akita Prefectural Board of Education.

Transportation

Railway
 East Japan Railway Company - Oga Line
 -  -  -

Highway

Bus
Akita Chūō Kōtsū

Seaports
Port of Funagawa

Local attractions

Namahage Museum
Oga Aquarium Gao
Nyūdōzaki Lighthouse – one of the "50 Lighthouses of Japan"
Godzilla Rock
Wakimoto Castle, National Historic Site
Oga Onsen
Oga Athletic Stadium

Culture
Oga is famous for its Namahage Festival, a traditional event held on New Year's Eve in which groups of men dressed as ogre-like deities called "Namahage" with masks and straw raincoats visit houses at night.

Sister city relations
 Livingston, California, USA since August 18, 1984

Noted people from Oga
Kenya Kodama, footballer
Kazuo Nakamura (basketball), basketball coach
Shokichi Natsui, judoka
Shōji Nishimura, admiral
Hiromitsu Ochiai, baseball player and manager
Yoshihito Yoshida,  rugby union footballer
Yu Yoshimoto, basketball player

References

External links

Official Website 

 
Cities in Akita Prefecture
Populated coastal places in Japan
Port settlements in Japan